Ross Canyon is an undersea canyon named in association with Ross Sea. Name approved 6/88 (ACUF 228).
 

Canyons and gorges of Antarctica
Landforms of the Southern Ocean